Szimón Krofey was born in 1545 in the Kashubian village of Dąbie, Gmina Bytów, Poland. From paternal side he had German (Prussian) blood from his great great grand father who married a Kashubian woman. His father, Wawrzyniec Krofey, was the mayor of Dąbie, and was well enough off to send young Szimón off to the university at Wittenberg. In 1579, after finishing his studies, he became pastor of the Lutheran church in Bytów.

In 1586 and 1588, respectively, Reverend Krofey published two vitally important works in Kashubian, both of which were translations from German intended for Kashubian Lutherans: Duchowne piesnie D. Marciná Lutherá y ynßich naboznich męzow. Zniemieckiego w Slawięsky ięzik wilozone Przes Szymana Krofea, sluge slova Bozego w Bytowie. ("Spiritual Songs of Doctor Martin Luther") and Maly katechizm D. Marciná Lutherá Niemiecko-Wándalski ábo Słowięski to jestá z Niemieckiego językáw Słowięski wystáwion ("Small Catechism"). In 1896, the songbook was rediscovered in Smoldzino by Franz Tetner; the catechism was republished in 1643 by the Lutheran pastor Michael Brüggemann (also known as Mostnik or Pontanus), "polonised" in 1758, and ultimately "re-Kashubised" by Florian Ceynowa in 1861 as Pjnc głovnech wóddzałov evangjelickjeho katechizmu z njemjeckjeho na kaśebsko-słovjenskj jęzek.

Scholarly opinion is divided on whether Reverend Krofey's two books were the first books published in Kashubian, but the dispute hinges strictly on linguistic concerns, not historical. One side holds that Reverend Krofey wrote, as Józef Borzyszkowski puts it, "in Polish with abundant Kashubianisms." Jerzy Treder and Cezary Obracht-Prondzyński, on the other hand, hold that the works were written in Kashubian and therefore constitute "the origins of Kashubian literature:"

These two books are also considered important for an understanding of Slovincian, along with Brüggemann's reworking of the "Small Catechism" and similar texts published in 1700 by the Lutheran pastor J.M. Sporgius, also of Smoldzino.

Reverend Szimón Krofey died in 1590.  To honor his undisputed importance in the history of Kashubian literature, the Bytow chapter of the Kashubian-Pomeranian Association has recently issued a souvenir golden ducat called the "Krofeya."

References

Polish people of Kashubian descent
Polish people of German descent
Kashubian clergy
Kashubian culture
Polish Lutheran clergy
University of Wittenberg alumni
16th-century Lutheran clergy
Protestant Reformers